I Am Jonas is a French coming of age gay-themed movie released in 2018 and directed by Christophe Charrier. The film is also known as Boys and Jonas.

Plot
The plot is written in chronological order while the movie switches continuously between present and past.

It is 1997. Fifteen-year-old Jonas does not really have friends at school. When the school year starts, there is a new pupil in his class: Nathan, who immediately takes Jonas under his wing and they become friends. Nathan has a Nintendo Game Boy and teaches Jonas how to play Tetris and eventually gives him the computer as a gift. The two fall in love and start a relationship. Jonas is allowed by his parents to spend the weekend at Nathan's house. Nathan's mother is heavily pregnant and has already chosen a name for the child: Léonard. She drives the boys to a movie theatre, and on the ride they pass an amusement park called Magic World. Mother reveals to Jonas that Nathan got the scar on his face after an incident at the bumper cars, although Nathan had earlier told Jonas that it was caused by an attack of a pedophile priest. At the end of the movie they just watched, Nathan turns on his mobile phone and hears a message left by his mother: she went into hospital to give birth. Instead of going to the hospital, they go to Boys, a local gay bar. As the minimum age is eighteen years they are not allowed in. This is noticed by a man who has an idea: he will bring the boys to another gay bar where there is no age limit. They get in his car but soon Nathan gets suspicious as the ride takes too long and the boys plead with the driver to let them out. The driver punches Nathan and knocks him out. Jonas pulls up the handbrake and is able to escape. The car drives away with a closeup of Nathan – still in the car – and Jonas not knowing whether he is alive or dead.

Cast
 Félix Maritaud – Jonas Cassetti (adult)
 Nicolas Bauwens – Jonas Cassetti (adolescent)
 Tommy-Lee Baïk – Nathan
 Aure Atika – Nathan's mother
 Marie Denarnaud – Jonas' mother
 Pierre Cartonnet – Jonas' father
 Ilian Bergala – Léonard
 Ingrid Granziani – Caroline Rivasso (adult)
 Édith Saulnier – Caroline Rivasso (adolescent) 
 David Baiot – Samuel

Release and reception
The film was originally released as Boys on the streaming platform Dekkoo in August 2018. It was then screened as Jonas at the Festival de la fiction TV de La Rochelle in September, where it won three awards, including Best TV Movie. In November 2018, it was broadcast on French TV channel Arte, attracting over 1,12 million viewers. It subsequently premiered on Netflix under its final title, I Am Jonas.

Writing for The Guardian, André Wheeler described the film as a "dark, atmospheric [and] delightful slow-burn".

References

External links
 

2018 LGBT-related films
LGBT-related coming-of-age films
French LGBT-related films
French coming-of-age films
French drama films
Films set in 1997
Films set in 2015
Gay-related films
Teen LGBT-related films
2010s French films